Malma may refer to:

Dolly Varden trout, also known as Salvelinus malma malma
Malma, Nepal